The VSZ Slovak Open is a defunct professional tennis tournament played on outdoor red clay courts. It was part of the Association of Tennis Professionals (ATP) Challenger Series. It was held annually in Košice, Slovakia, from 1993 to 1998.

Past finals

Singles

Doubles

External links
ITF search

ATP Challenger Tour
Clay court tennis tournaments
Tennis tournaments in Slovakia